"Show Me a Leader" is a song written and performed by Alter Bridge, released as the lead single from the band's fifth album, The Last Hero. It was made available as a digital download on July 26, 2016, by Napalm Records, the band's first release on the label, except in the United States, where it was released by Alter Bridge Recordings via Caroline Records. The song's music video was released online on August 31, 2016.

Background
"Show Me a Leader" was first streamed on Sirius XM's Octane on July 25, 2016, followed by a digital release the following day.

Composition
According to singer Myles Kennedy, "Lyrically, [the song] reflects the frustrations that a lot of people are feeling with the current state of the world. The world is looking for trustworthy effective leadership and not this undignified dog and pony show that's really made a mockery of our system." He claims that the song "doesn't push an agenda; it simply expresses a very common sense of disillusionment people seem to be feeling at this point in time." Regarding the song's musical composition, lead guitarist Mark Tremonti said that Kennedy originally came up with the song's intro, and a part he had been working on himself became the chorus.  It is also Alter Bridge's first time using seven-string guitars on a record. The song, like the rest of the album, was produced by Michael Baskette, who has worked with Alter Bridge since its 2007 album Blackbird.

Personnel
Musicians
 Myles Kennedy — lead and backing vocals, rhythm and lead guitar
 Mark Tremonti — lead guitar
 Brian Marshall — bass
 Scott Phillips — drums
Production
 Michael "Elvis" Baskette — production
 Ted Jensen — mastering

Chart performance

References

2016 singles
2016 songs
Alter Bridge songs
Songs written by Mark Tremonti
Songs written by Myles Kennedy
Songs written by Brian Marshall
Songs written by Scott Phillips (musician)
Song recordings produced by Michael Baskette
Napalm Records singles